South East FC is a Dominican professional football club based in La Plaine. The club competes in the Dominica Premier Division League, the top tier of Dominica football.

The club has won three league titles, coming in 2006–07, 2018–19 and 2020.

Current roster
The current roster 2021/22: 2022 Caribbean Club Shield

Honors 
Dominica Premier League: 3
 2007
2019
2020

References 

Football clubs in Dominica